"This Is the Home of the Brave" is a Pashto-language nasheed and the de facto national anthem of the Islamic Emirate of Afghanistan. It is an a cappella song, meaning that it does not contain musical instruments, as instruments are considered haram (religiously prohibited or outlawed) by many Islamic scholars in Afghanistan.

The Islamic Emirate of Afghanistan (Afghanistan under the rule of the Taliban) had formal laws specifying its flag and emblem, however no anthem was specified. This nasheed was commonly used in the opening credits of the broadcasts by Da Shariat Zhagh ("Voice of Sharia"), the Taliban's official radio station, since the late 1990s, when the group controlled most of the Afghanistan territory, as well as in the videos published by the Taliban's Commission of Cultural Affairs. It was also used during official ceremonies; for example, in 2013, when the Islamic Emirate opened its political office in Doha, Qatar, the song was played during the flag-raising ceremony. Due to that, it is considered to be the de facto national anthem of the Islamic Emirate of Afghanistan and the Taliban.

The recording most commonly used for this anthem features the voice of Mullah Faqir Muhammad Darwesh, a popular Taliban munshid (nasheed singer).



Lyrics

See also
 National anthem of Afghanistan

Notes

References 

Afghan songs
National symbols of Afghanistan
National anthems
Asian anthems
Nasheeds
Pashto-language songs